These are the official results of the Women's Heptathlon competition at the 1988 Summer Olympics in Seoul, South Korea. There were a total number of 32 entrants, with three non-starters. The competition was held on September 23, 1988, and September 24, 1988.

Records
These were the standing World and Olympic records (in points) before the 1988 Summer Olympics.

The following World and Olympic record was set during this competition.

Summary
Coming in to the Olympics, Jackie Joyner-Kersee stood well ahead of the world.  As a 26 year old, she was at the peak of her career and the returning silver medalist had steadily improved since the first Olympic heptathlon.  In the previous two years, she had amassed the top five marks in history, including the world record of 7215, set at the Olympic Trials.  Along the way, she also tied Heike Drechsler for the world record in the long jump.  She was famously coached by her husband Bob Kersee, who also coached her sister in law Florence Griffith Joyner to the astounding 10.49 world record in the 100 metres at those same trials.  #2 in history Sabine John was also in this competition, but her personal best was more than 200 points behind Joyner-Kersee.  Her GDR teammate Anke Behmer was the #5 performer in history and almost another 200 points behind John.  Soviet Natalya Shubenkova was the #4 performer in history.

Running head to head against her chief rivals, JJK recorded an Olympic heptathlon best 12.69 in the third heat of the first event, the 100 metres hurdles.  John's 12.85 still left her 25 points behind.  In the high jump JJK jumped clean through 1.83, which is where Behmer topped out and John could not clear, then she made 1.86 on her second attempt to tie three others for the event lead.  After 2 events, JJK already had over a hundred-point lead.  The competition appeared settled, the world record was clearly her target as her husband/coach reinforced with every instruction from the stands.  In John's best event, the shot put, her 16.23m did gain 28 points on Joyner-Kersee's second place 15.80m lifetime personal best, nobody else was less than a metre behind John.  Concluding the first day, Joyner-Kersee's Olympic heptathlon best 22.56 left Behmer in second place, more than a half second behind.

Not only was it the Olympic heptathlon best, it was the Olympic record for the long jump. To date it remains the World heptathlon best. John, in second place, was more than a half metre behind and she was 181 points behind in the competition. The sixth event, the javelin, was the first event Joyner-Kersee didn't dominate, with her 45.66m, she was only fourth best. But among the leaders, Shubenkova was the only one to gain points. Joyner-Kersee would enter the final event, the 800 metres, with a 429-point lead. But before that she needed to take another excursion across the stadium to compete in the qualifying round of the long jump. Her 6.96m first attempt surpassed the automatic qualifier. It would take a 2:13.6 to equal the world record, a time that was within Joyner-Kersee's range, she had run a half a second faster in the 1984 Olympics. And with the huge lead, she would virtually have to collapse to fail to win the gold. Going for the world record, Joyner-Kersee keyed off of the three East German athletes, all with superior 800 metre credentials to hers. When the three surged on the final backstretch, to break away from Shubenkova, Joyner-Kersee went with them. Behmer sprinted the final straightaway to take a 2:04.20 event victory while JJK struggled the last 100 metres, getting caught by Shubenkova before the line. While 4 of her top 5 pursuers took back points in the 800, she put another 76 points onto the world record. Her final score, 7291. To date, no other athlete has exceeded 7032, that by Carolina Klüft in the 2007 World Championships. And she would defend the heptathlon title in 1992. John scored 6897 to take silver, her lifetime personal best. Behmer also scored her personal best 6858 to take the bronze medal.

Final

See also
1984 Women's Olympic Heptathlon (Los Angeles)
1986 Women's European Championship Heptathlon (Stuttgart)
1987 Women's World Championship Heptathlon (Rome)
 1988 Hypo-Meeting
1990 Women's European Championship Heptathlon (Split)
1991 Women's World Championship Heptathlon (Tokyo)
1992 Women's Olympic Heptathlon (Barcelona)

References

External links
 Results

Heptathlon
1988
1988 in women's athletics
Women's events at the 1988 Summer Olympics

it:Atletica leggera ai Giochi della XXV Olimpiade - Eptathlon